Minuscule 518 (in the Gregory-Aland numbering), 504 (Scrivener's numbering), ε 263 (in the Soden numbering), is a Greek minuscule manuscript of the New Testament, on parchment. Palaeographically it has been assigned to the 12th century. 
It was adapted for liturgical use, it has marginalia.

Description 

The codex contains the complete text of the four Gospels on 249 parchment leaves (size ) with only one lacunae (Matthew 16:2-17). The text is written in one column per page, 23 lines per page.

There is also a division according to the smaller Ammonian Sections (in Mark 240 Sections, the last in 16:19), (no references the Eusebian Canons).

Text 

The Greek text of the codex is a representative of the Byzantine text-type. Hermann von Soden included it to the Iφr group, it is similar to M group with Codex Campianus. Aland placed it in Category V.

According to the Claremont Profile Method it represents textual family Πa in Luke 1 (except beginning of Luke 1) and M27 in Luke 10 and Luke 20.

History 

In 1727 the manuscript came from Constantinople to England and was presented to archbishop of Canterbury, William Wake, together with the manuscripts 73, 74, 506-520. Wake presented it to the Christ Church College in Oxford.

The manuscript was added to the list of New Testament minuscule manuscripts by F. H. A. Scrivener (504) and C. R. Gregory (518), who saw it in 1883.

It is currently housed at the Christ Church (Wake 36) in Oxford.

See also 

 List of New Testament minuscules
 Biblical manuscript
 Textual criticism

References

Further reading

External links 

Greek New Testament minuscules
12th-century biblical manuscripts